Palladia, Inc. is a social services organization in New York City, working with individuals and families challenged by addiction, homelessness, AIDS, domestic violence, poverty and trauma. Founded in 1970, Palladia was known as Project Return Foundation until 2002. The organization began as a drug treatment facility and evolved to address the concerns of its clients, developing services such as domestic violence shelters, outpatient drug treatment programs, parenting programs, AIDS outreach, alternatives to incarceration, and transitional and permanent housing. Today Palladia serves over 1300 clients daily.

Palladia has long focused on the particular needs of women in treatment, staging conferences, pioneering ways to bring services to hard-to-reach clients  and developing programs that highlighted the connection between trauma and addiction. 
Palladia also developed several specialized programs that fostered connections between parents undergoing treatment and their children.

Social service programs
Palladia’s current programs include:

Starhill and Ujima House, residential drug treatment centers
Aegis, an emergency domestic violence shelter
Athena House, a transitional domestic violence shelter
Willow, 126th Street and The Fane, emergency shelters
CTI - Bronx and CTI - Manhattan, outpatient drug treatment centers
Palladia Wellness Center, an outpatient mental health center
Esperanza, a transitional housing program
The Clinical Consultation Program, a partnership with NYC’s Administration for Children’s Services, in which Palladia provides clinical expertise for mental health, domestic violence and substance abuse issues that affect ACS families
HomeBase, a homelessness prevention program

Supportive housing programs
Palladia uses real estate development to further its mission, and has eight permanent supportive housing buildings, which offer both housing and on-site social services to residents, who include homeless individuals and families, many affected by substance abuse, mental illness, medical disabilities and other challenges. Palladia’s supportive housing projects include the following buildings:

Cedar Tremont, an 18 unit building for families, located in the Bronx
Dreitzer House, a 38 unit building for families, located in Manhattan
Hill House, a 44 unit building for individuals, located in the Bronx
Jerome Court, a 41 unit building for individuals, located in the Bronx
Stratford House, a 61 unit building for families, located in the Bronx
Chelsea Court, an 18 unit building for individuals, located in Manhattan
Flora Vista, a 20 unit building for individuals, located in Manhattan
Fox Point, a 48 unit building for families and individuals, located in the Bronx

In addition, Palladia operates several “scattered site” supportive housing programs in the Bronx, Manhattan and Brooklyn.

Awards and honors
U.S. Substance Abuse and Mental Health Services Administration’s Exemplary Program Award
Andrew Heiskell Community Renaissance Award
The HomeBase program, of which Palladia was a founding service provider, was a finalist for the finalist for Harvard University’s Kennedy School of Government’s Innovations in American Government Award
Palladia's Cedar Tremont House won third place in the national MetLife awards for Excellence in Affordable Housing
Palladia's Hill House won second place in the national MetLife awards for Excellence in Affordable Housing
Palladia's Chelsea Court received the New York State Design Award of Merit, the New York Chapter Housing Design Award and the National Housing PIA Award from the American Institute of Architects and was featured in Residential Architect magazine
Chelsea Court was featured at the "Affordable Housing: Designing an American Asset" exhibition at the National Building Museum  in Washington D.C. and in the related book, Affordable Housing: Designing an American Asset
Chelsea Court was included in a profile of "New York's Best Affordable Housing"
Palladia's Aegis domestic violence shelter received a design makeover that was featured in Interior Design magazine, Real Estate Weekly, and eOculus.
Palladia's Fox Point is among the first LEED Gold certified green buildings in the Bronx. The building also received certification from Green Communities and its design was profiled in Structure Magazine and Green Building & Design magazine.
Fox Point's "Keeping Families Together" program was hailed as a successful alternative to foster care in a profile in City Limits magazine.
Fox Point was selected "Residence of the Year" by the Supportive Housing Network of New York.

References

Housing in New York City
Addiction organizations in the United States
Non-profit organizations based in New York City
Homelessness organizations
Therapeutic community
Affordable housing advocacy organizations
Homelessness charities
Affordable housing
Organizations established in 2002
2002 establishments in New York City
Mental health organizations in New York (state)